Christian August Voigt (21 August 1808 – 10 February 1890) was an Austrian anatomist born in Brody, Galicia.

He studied medicine in Vienna, receiving his doctorate in 1841 with a dissertation titled, De systemate Intermedio vasorum eiusque radicibus. In Vienna, he was influenced by the work of anatomist Christian Joseph Berres (1796-1844). From 1847 to 1850, he was a professor at the surgical-medical college in Laibach, afterwards teaching classes in Lemberg (1850–54), Krakow (1854–61) and Vienna (1861–78), where he was a professor of anatomy and histology. Voigt was a member of the Vienna Academy of Sciences.

Voigt is remembered for his anatomical investigations of the hair and skin. His name is associated with "Voigt's line", a pigmentary demarcation line that sometimes affects dark-skinned individuals. It is described as a dorsoventral line of pigmentation occurring symmetrically and bilaterally for about ten centimeters along the lateral edge of the biceps. The phenomenon is also known as "Futcher's line".

Written works 
 Abhandlung über die Richtung der Haare am menschlichen Körper, 1857 - Treatise on the direction of hair on the human body. 
 Über ein System neu entdeckter Linien an der Oberfläche des Körpers und über Hauptvera¨stelungs-Gebiete der Hautnerven, 1857 - A system of newly found lines on the surface of the human body, etc.
 Beiträge zur Dermato-Neurologie, nebst der Beschreibung eines Systems neu entdeckter Linien an der Oberfläche des menschlichen Körpers, 1864 - Contributions to dermato-neurology, including the description of a system of newly discovered lines on the surface of the human body.
Books about Christian August Voigt
 "Christian August Voigt (1808-1890), Professor der Anatomie in Laibach, Lemberg, Krakau und Wien", by Maria Habacher; 1967.

References 

1808 births
1890 deaths
University of Vienna alumni
Academic staff of the University of Vienna
Academic staff of the University of Lviv
Austrian anatomists